Broken Silence is the third studio album by American rapper Foxy Brown, released on July 17, 2001, by Violator and Ill Na Na Entertainment; distributed under Def Jam Recordings. The album debuted at number five on the Billboard 200 with first-week sales of 131,000 copies. It has been certified gold by the RIAA for shipments of 500,000 copies in the United States. This is Foxy's only album to be released in the 2000s, and remains her most recent release.

Background
Foxy Brown began recording a more street-oriented album, much different from her mainstream image with Chyna Doll. It was rumoured to have many features including, Nas, Ice Cube, AZ, Mary J. Blige, Toni Braxton, Haifa Wehbe and Amr Diab.

The song "Na Na Be Like" was nominated for a Grammy in 2003, two years after its release.

Legacy
Rapper Nicki Minaj has stated that this album was a huge influence to her as a young girl.

Commercial Performance 
Broken Silence received little to no promotion mainly relying on the support of her fans around the world. Broken Silence charted for 13 Weeks in The United States, 11 Weeks in Canada, 9 Weeks in Switzerland, 7 Weeks in Germany, 7 Weeks in France, 3 Weeks in The Netherlands, 4 Weeks in the United Kingdom, and 1 Week in Belgium.

Foxy Brown would only do an exclusive article with The Source. She also did a few interviews and performances to promote her singles.

Singles
"Oh Yeah" is the first single from Trinidadian American female hip-hop artist Foxy Brown's third album Broken Silence. The music video was shot in Jamaica in the middle of 2001. It starts with Foxy Brown rapping in a forest near the river and later with her then boyfriend and the track's featuring artist Spragga Benz.

"BK Anthem", a song that was originally recorded and released as a street single in late 2000 was released as a B-side to the "Oh Yeah"s single. The music video was shot with a camcorder style. The song peaked at number 82 on the U.S. Billboard R&B charts and failed to make the Billboard Hot 100

"Candy" was never officially released, only as a vinyl release. The song had no official video, and Brown refused to concede to Def Jams wishes to release the song, based on its huge popularity, instead, preferring to release "Tables Will Turn". Despite this, and the fact it had little to no official promotion, no music video, it was hugely successful on the radio; it managed to chart at 48 on the R&B/Hip-Hop Singles & Track Chart and number 10 on the Rap charts. "Candy" is the highest charted song from the album. The song was also featured on many soundtracks, noticeably, the film The 40-Year-Old Virgin, Dark Angel Sound track  and Friday After Next.

Track listing

Charts

Weekly charts

Year-end charts

Certifications and sales

References

2001 albums
Foxy Brown (rapper) albums
Albums produced by the Neptunes
Albums with cover art by Tony Duran
Def Jam Recordings albums